In Greek mythology, the name Apisaon refers to two defenders of Troy during the Trojan War:

Apisaon, son of Phausius, who confronted Ajax the Great but was killed by Eurypylus.
Apisaon of Paeonia, son of Hippasus, killed by Lycomedes.

Notes

References 

 Homer, The Iliad with an English Translation by A.T. Murray, Ph.D. in two volumes. Cambridge, MA., Harvard University Press; London, William Heinemann, Ltd. 1924. . Online version at the Perseus Digital Library.
Homer, Homeri Opera in five volumes. Oxford, Oxford University Press. 1920. . Greek text available at the Perseus Digital Library.

Trojans